Arun is a village in Badakhshan Province in north-eastern Afghanistan.

References

Populated places in Maimay District